Kemira Wijenayake (born 10 October 2001) is a Sri Lankan cricketer. He made his Twenty20 debut on 6 March 2021, for Bloomfield Cricket and Athletic Club in the 2020–21 SLC Twenty20 Tournament. He made his List A debut on 27 October 2021, for Sri Lanka Air Force Sports Club in the 2021–22 Major Clubs Limited Over Tournament.

References

External links
 

2001 births
Living people
Sri Lankan cricketers
Bloomfield Cricket and Athletic Club cricketers
Sri Lanka Air Force Sports Club cricketers
Place of birth missing (living people)